This Day in June is a picture book written by Gayle E. Pitman, illustrated by Kristyna Litten, and published May 5, 2014 by Magination Press. The book follows a family as they attend a pride parade.

The book won the 2015 Stonewall Book Award for Children's and Young Adult Literature, and in 2018, it was the tenth-most banned and challenged book in the United States.

End notes 
In addition to the story portrayed in the book, This Day in June provides "[s]ubstantial endnotes [that] discuss each scene and provide context for the people and groups represented, along with parental tips for discussing gender and sexuality." Further, "a 'Note to Parents and Caregivers' offers suggestions for talking to various age levels of children about LGBT families."

Reception 
Publishers Weekly complimented the illustrations, stating, "Litten’s artwork that creates a sense of joyous excitement and showcases the diversity on display. Wisely, Litten only outlines the happy crowds and buildings in the background ..., saving color and detail for the marchers themselves."

The book was included in Advocate's "What Book Changed the Lives of Our '40 Under 40'?" Explaining the choice, staff writer Erica Anderson wrote, "I love that it teaches tolerance and acceptance and makes pride something everyone can celebrate. The book also includes a reading guide for parents."

School Library Journal highlighted the book's "realistic" diversity, noting the inclusion of "both homosexual and heterosexual people, young and old, ... individuals, couples, and families." They continued, saying, "This beautifully illustrated book is a great addition to a school or personal library to add diversity in a responsible manner without contributing to stereotypes about LGBT people."

Controversy 
Due to its inclusion of LGBT content, This Day in June was the tenth-most banned and challenged book in the United States in 2018, and the 42nd-most banned and challenged book between 2010 and 2019.

References 

2014 children's books
Children's books with LGBT themes
Stonewall Book Award-winning works
2010s children's books
Censored books
Censorship of LGBT issues
American picture books